Khandoker Wasim Iqbal (born 21 November 1961) is a retired Bangladeshi football player and coach. He mainly played as a right winger, and was one of the most recognised players during the early years of Bangladeshi football. He was a prominent member of the Bangladesh national football team during the majority of the 80s.

Club career
Wasim's career began with his local club Brothers Union's youth team, where he took part in the Pioneer League. During his time with the youth team, Wasim managed to impress the club's captain Shahiduddin Ahmed Selim, and was promoted to the senior team, within a year. Under the legendary Brothers' coach Abdul Gofur Beluch, Wasim made his Dhaka League debut against Dhaka Wanderers. He started his career as a striker, but was soon converted to an out an out right winger in a 4-2-4 system and in his debut season of 1979, he scored in a 1–0 victory over Mohammedan SC. In 1984 he was named the club's captain.

Wasim’s career with "The Oranges" saw him win the Federation Cup in 1980 and the Aga Khan Gold Cup in 1982. The late 70s and early 80s was the golden era for Brothers Union as their academy setup produced national team players like Hasanuzzaman Bablu, Mohammed Mohsin and the ever-dependable Wasim himself, whose technical ability was not something many local players had at the time. During Brothers' Aga Khan Gold Cup triumph in 1982, Wasim scored as the club routed the Oman national football team 3–1. He was a guest player during Mohammedan SC's Ashis-Jabbar Shield Tournament win in India. 

One of Wasim's most forgettable moments occurred during the 1985 Dhaka League deciding match against Abahani Krira Chakra, with Brother's needing a win to claim their first league title, they soon took a two-goal lead against their rivals, furthermore Wasim found himself in a one-one situation with the Abahani's Sri Lankan goalkeeper Chandrashir, however, his miss saw Abahani win the game 3–2 ending Wasim's hope for a first league title with his boyhood club.

Soon, Wasim attracted interest from overseas and ended up joining Kolkata based Indian giants SC East Bengal in 1987, and took part in the Rovers Cup. After spending a year playing abroad, Wasim returned to Bangladesh by joining Abahani Krira Chakra. He spent two years (1988 to 1990) with the club winning the Dhaka League in 1989 and also India's Sait Nagjee Trophy, with Wasim assisting Aslam's winner in the final. In 1990 Wasim returned to Brothers, and spent two more years at the club before retiring in 1992 at the age of 31.

International career
In 1980, Wasim played for the Bangladesh U-19 team and soon became a member for the senior national team, making his official debut during the 1982 Quaid-e-Azam, in Pakistan. Wasim regularly featured for the Bangladesh national team from 1982 to 1989, and captained the side at the 1984 South Asian Games in Nepal, during which he struck a brace against the hosts. One of his most memorable matches for the national side came during the 1984 AFC Asian Cup qualifiers against the Philippines, when he almost single-handedly won the match for Bangladesh with his two solo goals in the first half.

On 8 March 1989, Wasim scored his last goal for the country, during what's considered to be one of Bangladesh's best ever performances in international football, thrashing Thailand 3–1 at the 1990 FIFA World Cup qualifiers. Before the start of the 1989 South Asian Games, coach Nasser Hejazi dropped many regular faces including Wasim, resulting in his retirement from international football. It was suspected that as Wasim played for Abahani Limited Dhaka at the time, the former Mohammedan SC coach cum player Hejazi did not want him in the team.

International goals
Scores and results list Bangladesh's goal tally first.

International goals for club

Brothers Union

Style of play
Wasim dominated the domestic football scene in the 80s in the colours of Brothers Union with his deft dodges, speed, lethal crosses and stunning goals. He was mainly known for his dribbles and is considered to be the best dribbler of the ball Bangladesh ever produced.

Managerial career
After retiring, Wasim started his coaching career with his former club Brothers Union's under 19 team and later went on to manage the senior team for three years. However, his managerial career has not been very successful compared to his playing days. In 2013, he took charge of Sheikh Jamal DC, for the 2013 Super Cup. He focused on grassroots coaching with United City in the Third Division League and Little Friends Club in the Second Division League.

In October 2021, he became the general manager of Sheikh Russel KC in the Bangladesh Premier League.

In March 2022, Iqbal was dismissed from the general manager post of Sheikh Russel KC.

Personal life
Wasim studied in Ramakrishna Mission High School, which is where he learned how to play football, due to his father's persistence. During the peak of his career Wasim appeared in the movie Johnny Ustad, where he acted alongside film stars like Zafar Iqbal and Anju Ghosh.

Honours
Brothers Union
 Federation Cup = 1980*, 1991
 Aga Khan Gold Cup = 1981–82*

Mohammedan SC
 Ashis-Jabbar Shield Tournament (India) = 1982

Abahani Limited Dhaka
 Federation Cup = 1988
 Sait Nagjee Trophy = 1989
 Dhaka League = 1989–90
 Independence Cup = 1990

Bangladesh 
 South Asian Games Silver medal = 1984, 1985

Awards and accolades
1985 − Sports Writers Association's Best Footballer Award.
2006 − National Sports Award.

References

 
Living people
1961 births
Footballers from Dhaka
Bangladeshi footballers
Bangladesh international footballers
Bangladesh youth international footballers
Abahani Limited (Dhaka) players
Brothers Union players
East Bengal Club players
Association football wingers
Bangladeshi expatriate footballers
Bangladeshi expatriate sportspeople in India
Asian Games competitors for Bangladesh
Footballers at the 1982 Asian Games
Footballers at the 1986 Asian Games
South Asian Games medalists in football
South Asian Games silver medalists for Bangladesh
Recipients of the Bangladesh National Sports Award
Bangladeshi football managers
Bangladesh Football Premier League managers